The Montana Kid is a 1931 pre-Code American Western film directed by Harry L. Fraser starring the team of Bill Cody and Andy Shuford.

Plot
Minutes before he is to meet his young son Andy, the drunken Mr. Burke is cheated in gambling and is tricked into signing his ranch over when he thinks he is signing an I.O.U to saloon gambler Chuck Larson. Larson goads Burke into a fight where he kills him. Burke's friend Bill Denton takes custody of Andy, and when the two are evicted of their property Bill vows a just revenge.

Cast 
Bill Cody as Bill Denton
Andy Shuford as Andy Burke
Doris Hill as Molly Moore
William L. Thorne as Chuck Larson
John Elliott as Burke
Gordon De Main as Marshal Jack Moore
Paul Panzer as Henchman Gabby

Notes

External links 

1931 films
1931 romantic drama films
1931 Western (genre) films
1930s action films
1930s English-language films
American black-and-white films
American romantic drama films
Films directed by Harry L. Fraser
Monogram Pictures films
American Western (genre) films
Films with screenplays by Harry L. Fraser
1930s American films